Mohamed Haddadou (born 24 December 1974) is a French former professional footballer who played as a midfielder. He played in Ligue 2 with USL Dunkerque, Le Mans Union Club 72 and Stade Reims.

References
 
 

Sportspeople from Saint-Germain-en-Laye
1974 births
Living people
French footballers
Tours FC players
Le Mans FC players
Stade de Reims players
Ligue 2 players
AS Poissy players
Association football midfielders
Footballers from Yvelines